Elizabeth Anne Livingstone  (7 July 1929 – 1 January 2023), also known as E. A. Livingstone, was an English Anglican theologian, who specialised in patristics.

Life

Education 
Livingstone held a Master of Arts degree from the University of Oxford and a Lambeth Doctorate of Divinity.

Academic work 
Livingstone was co-editor with Frank Leslie Cross of the first edition of The Oxford Dictionary of the Christian Church in 1957 and continued as editor of later editions after Cross's death in 1968. She is also the editor of The Concise Oxford Dictionary of the Christian Church.

Livingstone organised the Oxford International Conferences on Patristic Studies from 1969 to 1995, and also edited the record of the proceedings published as Studia Patristica.

Personal life and death 
Livingstone died on 1 January 2023, at the age of 93.

Honours 
In the 1986 New Year Honours, Livingstone was appointed a Member of the Order of the British Empire for "services to Patristic Studies". She was one of four people to be awarded the President's Medal of the British Academy in 2015.

Livingstone was an Honorary Fellow of St Stephen's House, Oxford.

Selected works

References

1929 births
2023 deaths
20th-century Anglican theologians
20th-century English theologians
English Anglican theologians
Holders of a Lambeth degree
Members of the Order of the British Empire
Patristic scholars
Recipients of the President's Medal (British Academy)
Women Christian theologians